Lismakeeve is a townland in the civil parish of Glenkeen
in County Tipperary, Ireland.

It contains the hamlet of Ileigh, the location of a Catholic church, which lends its name to that of the encompassing ecclesiastical parish of Borrisoleigh and Ileigh, this ecclesiastical parish being unusual in that it is co-extensive with the civil parish.

References

Townlands of County Tipperary